Open Season 3 is a 2010 American computer-animated comedy film produced by Sony Pictures Animation with animation provided by Reel FX Creative Studios. It is the third installment in the Open Season film series and the sequel to Open Season 2 (2008). Directed by Cody Cameron, the film theatrically premiered in Russia on October 21, 2010 and was released as a direct-to-video in the United States and Canada on January 25, 2011. The film received mixed reviews from critics and grossed $7 million worldwide.

When Boog the grizzly bear accidentally switches places with a lookalike circus grizzly named Doug, it is up to Boog's best friend Elliot the mule deer and the other animals to save him before the circus returns to Russia.

Plot
One spring morning several years after the events of the previous film, Boog awakens after hibernation and plans an annual guys' trip to spend time with his male best friends. Unfortunately, Elliot has distanced himself from Boog since he had started a family with Giselle. They are now the parents of three children: Gisela, Giselita, and Elvis (with Boog now being the honorary uncle). Boog is disappointed that everyone else wants to spend time with their families (especially since he does not have a mate of his own), which causes him to go on the guys trip by himself with his plush toy, Dinkleman; however, this soon leads him to a Russian traveling circus called the Maslova Family Circus. While there, Boog meets Doug, a lazy, self-centered, mean, scruffy grizzly bear who is unable to perform circus tricks and is tired of performing in the circus on the sidelines. He craves recognition as a full-fledged king of the forest, the ruler of the wildlife. Doug then tricks Boog into switching places, promising to his Argentinian camelid best friend Alistair that he will come back to bring him to the forest. Doug does not keep the promise and poses as Boog to enslave the forest animals, causing Alistair to reveal his plan to Boog back in the circus. However, Boog forgives Alistair for his involvement in Doug's scam, and eventually bonds with him over their mutual feeling of being abandoned by their respective best friend.

During his time in the circus, Boog falls madly in love with Ursa, a female grizzly bear who was born in Russia and can effortlessly walk on a tightrope, juggle, and dance (which Boog finds to be "bearvana") and was annoyed by Doug's mean, self-centered and lazy attitude before he left. At first, Boog has no luck convincing Ursa that he isn't Doug, causing her to be annoyed by his crush on her, so she dares Boog to prove to her that he isn't Doug by climbing up the high wire. Boog accepts and does so, but to his surprise, Ursa reveals that she knew he wasn't Doug the moment he rode the unicycle, as Doug was incapable of doing so, though it wasn't for nothing: Boog still had to be punished for juggling a dog in an earlier attempt to impress her. Ursa slowly warms up to Boog and begins to reciprocate his feelings after they learn more about each other and how different Boog is from other male grizzly bears like Doug, who tend to be mean and hate each other while Boog is polite and friendly, impressing Ursa, apart from the fact they both grew up around humans.

Meanwhile, Mr. Weenie and his friends, including a reformed Fifi and a newcomer named Nate, spot Boog on a TV commercial for the circus. Believing the performances in the commercial are attempts to kill Boog, they escape and try to rescue him, only to be caught by a gas station employee. They escape again, this time using Bob and Bobbie's RV to get to the circus. Meanwhile, Giselle, Gisela and Giselita discovers that Doug is not Boog and exposes him to the rest of the animals, who decide to rescue Boog under Elliot's lead before the circus travels back to Russia. There, they meet up with Mr. Weenie and the other pets and execute the plan. Although Boog is overjoyed to see his friends, he does not want to leave Ursa. Seeing how happy Boog is around Ursa, Elliot and the animals decide to let him go. Torn between his forest friends and Ursa, Boog invites her to live with them in the forest. Ursa agrees, but claims that a Russian circus without a bear is not a circus. Suddenly, Doug arrives, apologizes to Boog for tricking him, and reunites with Alistair, realizing what he had done before he escaped. Now that the circus has a bear again, Ursa accepts Boog's invitation to live with him in the forest, and leaves with Boog and their friends while Doug performs with Alistair.

The next morning, Ursa begins to enjoy her new life in the forest and ultimately becomes Boog's mate and the honorary aunt of Elliot and Giselle's kids, while also hinting that she and Boog will soon have a child of their own. Finally, Boog, Elliot, and their male friends go on their guys' trip and sing part of Willie Nelson's "On the Road Again." Elsewhere, Mr. Weenie and the pets travel to Devils Tower with Bob and Bobbie as they've been currently searching for aliens, and the circus begins its long journey back to Russia. In the ending credits, Doug and Alistair reveal a slideshow of themselves enjoying their tour around the world as they make their way back home.

Cast

Production

The film was animated at Reel FX Creative Studios, which also did animation for Open Season 2 along with Sony Pictures Imageworks. A teaser trailer for the film was released on January 5, 2010, on the Cloudy with a Chance of Meatballs DVD.

Release
Like the second and fourth film, Open Season 3 was released theatrically in different countries:

 Russia – October 21, 2010
 Kazakhstan – October 21, 2010
 Mexico – October 29, 2010
 Turkey – December 3, 2010
 Lebanon – December 16, 2010
 United Arab Emirates – December 23, 2010
 Greece – February 24, 2011
 Colombia – March 18, 2011

Home media
The film was released on DVD, Blu-ray, and UMD Video in the United States on January 25, 2011, by Sony Pictures Home Entertainment (under Columbia Pictures).

Reception

DVD Verdict gave the film a negative review, saying: "This tiresomely predictable tale exemplifies everything that's wrong about straight-to-DVD animated sequels to big-budget mainstream films: the plot is utterly predictable and rehashes a lot of beats from the original effort, the major voice actors have been replaced by poor substitutes and the quality of the animation has dropped dramatically (most of the visuals are on the level of a video game or one of those cheap CGI Saturday morning TV shows)". R.L. Shaffer of IGN gave the film a slightly positive review saying the animation is fine, and the kids are bound to enjoy it, but Open Season 3 boasts a dull story that feels like it's on autopilot.

Sequel

The sequel Open Season: Scared Silly premiered in theaters in Turkey on December 18, 2015, and was released on DVD and Blu-ray in the United States and Canada on March 8, 2016. Although it was released after the third film, it is considered a prequel because the absence of certain characters from the third film indicate it takes place before the events of the third film.

Notes

References

External links
 
 
 
 
 
 

2010 films
2010s American animated films
2010s children's comedy films
2010 3D films
3D animated films
2010 computer-animated films
American 3D films
American buddy comedy films
American children's animated comedy films
American computer-animated films
Animated buddy films
Animated films about bears
Animated films about llamas
Circus films
Direct-to-video sequel films
Films directed by Cody Cameron
Films set in forests
Grizzly bears in popular culture
Open Season (franchise)
Reel FX Creative Studios films
Sony Pictures Animation films
Sony Pictures direct-to-video films
2010 directorial debut films
2010s buddy comedy films
2010 comedy films
2010s English-language films